Troels Harry (born 25 December 1990) is a Danish curler. He is a former world junior champion and current Danish champion.

Career
Harry has represented Denmark in four World Junior Championships. He played lead for Rasmus Stjerne in 2007 and 2008, finishing fourth and seventh, respectively. In 2009, Denmark, with Harry as lead under Stjerne, made the playoffs. They were defeated by Canada in the page 1 vs. 2 game, but rebounded with a win over the United States in the semifinal and defeated Canada in the final to win the gold medal. Harry played at the lead position under Mikkel Krause at the 2010 World Junior Curling Championships, but finished in eight place.

In international play, Harry played lead for Stjerne at the 2010 European Curling Championships, and made the playoffs, where they defeated Germany and Switzerland to play Norway in the gold medal game. Norway's Thomas Ulsrud won a close game over Stjerne, leaving him the silver medal. The next year, at the 2011 European Curling Championships, the team again made the playoffs, but lost in an extra end in the page 3 vs. 4 game to the Czech Republic, relegating him to the bronze medal game. However, Denmark defeated the Czech Republic in the bronze medal game.

Harry represented Denmark at the 2012 World Men's Curling Championship in Basel, where Denmark finished outside of the playoffs. Harry represented Denmark again at the 2013 Ford World Men's Curling Championship and the 2016 World Men's Curling Championship.

External links
 

1990 births
Living people
Danish male curlers
Curlers at the 2014 Winter Olympics
Olympic curlers of Denmark
Continental Cup of Curling participants
21st-century Danish people